Michael Redmond may refer to:

Michael Redmond (comedian) (born 1950), Irish stand-up comedian and actor
Michael Redmond (Go player) (born 1963), American professional Go player
Michael Redmond (politician), Canadian politician
Mike Redmond (born 1971), former Major League Baseball catcher
Mickey Redmond (born 1947), former professional hockey player